The yellow-bellied whistler (Pachycephala philippinensis), or Philippine whistler, is a species of bird in the family Pachycephalidae that is endemic to the Philippines.

Its natural habitats are subtropical or tropical moist lowland forest and subtropical or tropical moist montane forest.

Subspecies 
Seven subspecies are recognized:
 P. p. fallax – (McGregor, 1904): Originally described as a separate species. Found on Calayan Island (northern Philippines)
 P. p. illex – (McGregor, 1907): Originally described as a separate species. Found on Camiguin Norte Island (northern Philippines)
 P. p. philippinensis – (Walden, 1872): Found on Luzon and Catanduanes (northern Philippines)
 P. p. siquijorensis – Rand & Rabor, 1957: Found on Siquijor (south-central Philippines)
 P. p. apoensis – (Mearns, 1905): Originally described as a separate species. Found in east-central and southern Philippines
 P. p. basilanica – (Mearns, 1909): Found in Basilan (southwestern Philippines)
 P. p. boholensis – Parkes, 1966: Found in Bohol (south-central Philippines)

References

yellow-bellied whistler
Endemic birds of the Philippines
yellow-bellied whistler
Taxonomy articles created by Polbot